Cosquín is a small town in the province of Córdoba, Argentina, located about  from the city of Córdoba, and  from Buenos Aires. It is the head town of the Punilla Department, and is located on the banks of the Cosquín River, and on the foot of a small mountain (Cerro Pan de Azúcar).

Cosquín is the oldest town in the scenic Punilla Valley; the region was already populated by the 16th century. Cosquín was officially founded with the title of villa (town) on 4 August 1876, and declared a city on 26 August 1939.

In the past, the region of Cosquín was appreciated for its benign climate, recommended by physicians for pulmonary ailments, and a whole industry of hospitals and therapeutic establishments appeared in order to provide services to patients from Argentina and even other countries. As the popularity of this kind of treatment decreased, the economy of Cosquín became more focused on tourism.

Since 1961, Cosquín hosts an annual National Folklore Festival, which receives around 100,000 visitors

References

External links

 
 Villa Carlos Paz and Valle de Punilla
 Cosquín - Tourism portal.
 Cosquín Turismo - Tourism portal.
 Valle de Punilla - Tourism portal.
 WelcomeArgentina.com - Tourism portal (in English).
GRINFELD - Cosquin Festival Live online coverage (Largest National Folklore Festival of Argentina)

Populated places in Córdoba Province, Argentina
Populated places established in 1876
Tourism in Argentina
Cities in Argentina
1876 establishments in Argentina
Argentina
Córdoba Province, Argentina